TUVISA (short for ) is the municipal company responsible for urban transport in the city of Vitoria-Gasteiz, in the north of Spain. As of March 2022, the company operates 97 buses.

History 
On 30 October 2009, the whole network was reorganized, resulting in a lower number of lines operating with shorter headways. In October 2010, some changes to the network were made, with additional changes in September 2012 and February 2013. A tenth line was added to the network in 2015.

Routes 

L1 Circular
BEI
L3 Betoño-Zumaquera
L4 Lakua-Mariturri
L5 Salburua-Elejalde
L5a Salburua-Elejalde-Astegieta
L5b Salburua-Elejalde-Jundiz (Ariñez)
L5c Salburua-Elejalde-Jundiz itv
L6 Zabalgana-Arkaiate
L7 Borinbizkarra-Salburua
L8 Unibertsitatea
L9 Gamarra-Zumaquera
L10 Aldaia-Larrein

Night routes 
These lines, known as Gautxori, operate in Friday and Saturday nights.

G1 Lakua-Abetxuko
G2 Adurtza-Salburua
G3 Armentia-Zabalgana
G4 Sansomendi-Lakua
G6 Salburua-Aranbizkarra

See also 
 Vitoria-Gasteiz tram

References

Vitoria-Gasteiz
Transport in the Basque Country (autonomous community)
Bus companies of Spain
Basque companies
Transport companies established in 1967
Spanish companies established in 1967